Football is the most popular sport in Egypt, many Egyptians gather around to watch various Egyptian clubs and the Egyptian national football team play on an almost daily basis.

Al Ahly and Zamalek are amongst the most popular in the country, both of which are based in Cairo. Both teams compete in the Egyptian Premier League, the highest tier of Egyptian football. These two teams compete in the Cairo Derby.

Other notable teams include: Ismaily, Al-Masry, Al Ittihad and Pyramids FC.

Premier League
 
The Egyptian Premier League (League A) has eighteen teams.  

There is no official English translation or title for the Egyptian League.

Due to Sponsorships the official name of the league is the WE Premier League. The league was also called Vodafone Premier League back in the 2006/2007 for the same reasons.

National football team's achievements
 
The Egypt national football team, also known under the nickname of The Pharaohs, is, as their name states, the national team of Egypt and is administered by the Egyptian Football Association. The team was founded in 1921, although a team had been fielded in the 1920 Summer Olympics. Egypt participated in the 1924 Olympics, and achieved the eighth place in the 1928 Olympics.

The team has won multiple cups over the years. They won the African Cup of Nations 7 times. Egypt won the inaugural Cup in 1957, 1959, 1986, 1998, 2006, 2008 and 2010, making them record holders of most African cup wins and most wins in a row (for winning 3 times in a row).

Their highest FIFA ranking was in July 2010 where they were ranked 9th in the world, making it their greatest achievement. They were the first from an African country and also, from an Arab country to participate in the World Cup when they played in 1934, losing to Hungary 4-2. 

Egypt played their second World Cup in 1990, where they didn't pass through the first stage after tying Ireland, Netherlands and losing to England 1-0 in what still remains their last World Cup game.

Egypt Qualified for the 2018 World Cup which was the first time in 28 years. They were placed in Group A with hosts Russia, Uruguay and KSA. Egypt lost to Uruguay in the 90th minute and then lost 3-1 to Russia and scored the goal Mohamed Salah from a penalty in the last game against Saudi Arabia, Egypt lost 2-1 and scored the goal Mohamed Salah in the 22nd minute.

Africa 
 Africa Cup of Nations
 Winners (7):  1957,  1959,  1986,  1998,  2006,  2008,  2010 (Most successful team)
 Runners-up (2):  1962,  2017, 2022
 Third place (3):  1963,  1970,  1974
 Fourth place (3): 1976, 1980, 1984
 All-Africa Games
 Champions (2):  1987,  1995
 Third place (1):  1973
 Afro-Asian Cup of Nations
 Runners-up (2):  1988, 2007
 Nile Basin Tournament
 Champions (1):  2011 (Most successful team)

Other 
Egypt won the 1955 Mediterranean games. They were also runners up in the 1951 tournament.

Egypt's best place in the Olympics was fourth place in 1964.

In 2014, Egypt was one of the eight nations to take part in the first Unity World Cup.

They have won the Pan-Arab Games 4 times, the Arab Cup in 1992 and the Palestine Cup twice.

Stadiums
Egypt has a total of 27 football stadiums spread around the country. The main stadium used to be Cairo International Stadium, but when the Borg El Arab Stadium in Alexandria was built, it replaced it. The stadium has become the home stadium for the Egyptian National Team. This stadium carries a capacity of 86,000 which is great for all the fans who watch the Egyptian Premier League games. The reason that this stadium was built was for Egypt's bid for the 2010 FIFA World Cup.

Egypt has hosted 5 African Cups in 1959, 1974, 1986, 2006 and 2019. The country also hosted the 1997 U-17 World Cup and the 2009 U-20 World Cup.

See also

Egypt Cup
Egyptian Premier League
Egyptian Super Cup
Sultan Hussein Cup
List of football clubs in Egypt
Women's football in Egypt

References

External links
Soccer Egypt Dot Com